The 2015 AFC Cup qualifying play-off was played from 9 to 17 February 2015. A total of 14 teams competed in the qualifying play-off to decide five of the 32 places in the group stage of the 2015 AFC Cup.

Format
The bracket for the qualifying play-off, which consisted of two rounds (preliminary round and play-off round), was determined by the AFC based on the association ranking of each team. Each tie was played as a single match, with the team from the higher-ranked association hosting the match. Extra time and penalty shoot-out were used to decide the winner if necessary. The winners of each tie in the play-off round advanced to the group stage to join the 27 automatic qualifiers.

Teams
The following 14 teams (12 from West Zone, 2 from East Zone) were entered into the qualifying play-off:

Schedule
The schedule of the competition was as follows.

Bracket

Play-off West 1
Ahal advanced to Group C.

Play-off West 2
Al-Hidd advanced to Group B.

Play-off West 3
Salam Zgharta advanced to Group A.

Play-off West 4
Al-Jaish advanced to Group D.

Play-off East
Maziya advanced to Group E.

Preliminary round

|-
!colspan=3|West Zone

|}

Manang Marshyangdi Club withdrew.

Play-off round

|-
!colspan=3|West Zone

|-
!colspan=3|East Zone

|}

Notes

References

External links
AFC Cup, the-AFC.com

1